Clifford Stanton (2 December 1895–1979) was an English footballer who played in the Football League for Oldham Athletic. He was a prolific goalscorer in the Cheshire County League with Altrincham and Macclesfield, scoring 72 goals in two seasons.

References

1908 births
1970 deaths
English footballers
Association football forwards
English Football League players
Altrincham F.C. players
Oldham Athletic A.F.C. players
Macclesfield Town F.C. players